Bengt Valdemar Palmquist (4 April 1923 – 26 November 1995) was a Swedish sailor who competed in the Dragon class at the 1956, 1960 and 1968 Olympics. He won a gold medal in 1956, finishing 20th and sixth in 1960 and 1968, respectively; he was the helmsman in 1960. In 1975 he won a world title in the same event sailing with his sons Björn and Johan.

References

1923 births
1995 deaths
Swedish male sailors (sport)
Olympic sailors of Sweden
Sailors at the 1956 Summer Olympics – Dragon
Sailors at the 1960 Summer Olympics – Dragon
Sailors at the 1968 Summer Olympics – Dragon
Olympic gold medalists for Sweden
Olympic medalists in sailing
Royal Gothenburg Yacht Club sailors
Medalists at the 1956 Summer Olympics
Sportspeople from Gothenburg